The Linux Network Administrator's Guide is a book on setting up and running Unix networks. The first and second editions are freely available in electronic form under the GFDL. It was originally produced by Olaf Kirch and others as part of the Linux Documentation Project with help from O'Reilly. The second edition, from Terry Dawson, was released March 2000.  The third edition of the guide was written by Tony Bautts, with assistance from Gregor N. Purdy in February 2005, but is not freely available like the previous two versions.

Contents 

It includes the following sections:
 Introduction to Networking
 Issues of TCP/IP Networking
 Configuring the Networking Hardware
 Setting up the Serial Hardware
 Configuring TCP/IP Networking
 Name Service and Resolver Configuration
 Serial Line IP
 The Point-to-Point Protocol
 Various Network Applications
 The Network Information System
 The Network File System
 Managing UUCP
 Electronic Mail
 Getting email Up and Running
 Sendmail+IDA
 Netnews
 C News
 A Description of NNTP
 Newsreader Configuration
 A glossary
 Annotated Bibliography

External links
 The Second edition
 The Third edition

2005 non-fiction books
O'Reilly Media books
Books about Linux
System administration